Alexander Salmond may refer to:

Alex Salmond (born 1954), Scottish politician
Alexander Hutchinson Salmond (1850–1924), Australian surveyor

See also
Alexander Salmon (disambiguation)